Vanda scandens is a species of plant in the family Orchidaceae. It is endemic to Mindanao island and Palawan Island in the Philippines.

Its natural habitat is subtropical or tropical moist lowland forests.

It is an Endangered species on the IUCN Red List, threatened by habitat loss.

See also

References 

scandens
Endemic orchids of the Philippines
Flora of Mindanao
Flora of Palawan
Endangered flora of Asia
Taxonomy articles created by Polbot